Kelly's Heroes is a 1970 World War II comedy-drama heist film, directed by Brian G. Hutton, about a motley crew of American GIs who go AWOL in order to rob a French bank, located behind German lines, of its stored Nazi gold bars. The film stars Clint Eastwood and Telly Savalas, and co-stars Don Rickles, Carroll O'Connor, and Donald Sutherland providing the comic absurdity, with secondary, comedic roles by Harry Dean Stanton, Gavin MacLeod, Karl-Otto Alberty, and Stuart Margolin. The screenplay was written by British film and television writer Troy Kennedy Martin. The film was a US-Yugoslav co-production, filmed mainly in the Croatian village of Vižinada on the Istria peninsula.

Plot
During a thunderstorm in early September 1944, units of the 35th Infantry Division are nearing the French town of Nancy. One of the division's mechanized reconnaissance platoons is ordered to hold their position when the Germans counterattack. The outnumbered platoon is also hit by friendly fire from their own mortars.

Private Kelly, a former lieutenant scapegoated for a failed infantry assault, captures Colonel Dankhopf of Wehrmacht Intelligence. Interrogating his prisoner, Kelly notices the officer's briefcase has several gold bars disguised under lead plating. Curious, he gets the colonel drunk and learns that there is a cache of 14,000 gold bars, worth US$16 million ($ million today), stored in a bank vault  behind German lines in the French town of Clermont. When their position is overrun and the Americans pull back, a Tiger I tank kills Dankhopf.

Kelly decides to steal the gold. He recruits Supply Sergeant "Crapgame" in order to obtain the supplies and weapons that will be needed. A spaced-out tank commander known as "Oddball" overhears the heist plan and suggests his three unattached M4 Sherman tanks join the caper. With their commanding officer, Captain Maitland, preoccupied with visiting his uncle "The General" (and stealing a yacht), Kelly's platoon are all eager to join Kelly in the heist. After much argument, Kelly finally persuades cynical Master Sergeant "Big Joe" to go along.

Kelly decides that his infantrymen and Oddball's tanks and crew will proceed separately and meet near Clermont. The Shermans fight their way through the German lines, destroying a railway depot in the process, but the bridge they must cross is blown up by Allied fighter-bombers. Oddball contacts an engineering unit to build a bridge for the crossing, and the engineers in turn bring in even more men to supply support.

After losing their jeeps and half-tracks to friendly fire from an American fighter aircraft that mistakes them for Germans, Kelly and his men proceed on foot. They walk into a minefield, and Private Grace is blown up when he steps on a mine. The last two men still trapped in the minefield, PFC Mitchell and Corporal Job, are killed after being forced to engage a German patrol that suddenly arrives before Kelly and Big Joe can kill all the Germans.

Oddball links up with Kelly two nights later, bringing with him the extra troops that he has acquired. They battle their way across the river to Clermont. By this time, intercepted radio messages attract the notice of Major General Colt, who misinterprets them as efforts by an aggressive Army unit pushing forward on their own initiative. He immediately rushes to the new front to exploit this "breakthrough."

Clermont is defended by three Tiger tanks of the 1st SS Panzer Division and its infantry support. The Americans are able to eliminate the German infantry and two of the Tigers, but the final tank parks itself right in front of the bank after Oddball's last Sherman breaks down, leaving them stalemated. At Crapgame’s suggestion, Kelly, Big Joe, and Oddball approach the Tiger and offer the commander and his crew "a deal-deal": equal shares of the gold if the Tiger will shoot the armored doors off the bank.

After the Tiger blows the bank doors open, the Germans and Americans divide the spoils, each gold share amounting to US$875,000 (more than $14.8 million today). They go their separate ways, just barely ahead of the still-oblivious General Colt. His way into Clermont has been blocked by the joyous crowd of relieved French residents, who have been deceived by Big Joe into thinking that Colt is French Gen. Charles de Gaulle.

Cast

 Clint Eastwood as Kelly
 Telly Savalas as "Big Joe"
 Don Rickles as "Crapgame"
 Carroll O'Connor as General Colt
 Donald Sutherland as "Oddball"
 Gavin MacLeod as Moriarty
 Hal Buckley as Maitland
 Stuart Margolin as Little Joe
 Jeff Morris as "Cowboy"
 Richard Davalos as Gutkowski
 Perry Lopez as Petuko (often nicknamed on screen as "Pachuco").
 Tom Troupe as Job
 Harry Dean Stanton as Willard (credited as Dean Stanton)
 Dick Balduzzi as Fisher
 Gene Collins as Babra
 Len Lesser as Bellamy
 David Hurst as Colonel Dankhopf (credited on screen as "Colonel Dummkopf").
 Fred Pearlman as Mitchell
 Michael Clark as Grace
 George Fargo as Penn
 Dee Pollock as "Jonesy" Jones
 George Savalas as Mulligan
 John Heller as German Lieutenant
 Shepherd Sanders as "Turk"
 Karl Otto Alberty as German Tank Commander

Production

Origins

The screenplay was written by British film and television writer Troy Kennedy Martin. He relied on a true story, featured as "The Greatest Robbery on Record" in Guinness World Records from 1956 to 2000. On 4 December 1968, Elliott Morgan, MGM's Head of Research, wrote to the Guinness Book of World Records requesting information on this entry: "The greatest robbery on record was of the German National Gold Reserves in Bavaria by a combine of U.S. military personnel and German civilians in 1945". On 10 December the editor, Norris D. McWhirter, wrote back to Morgan, stating that he had very little information and that he essentially suspected that there had been a cover-up, which required that the story should be subject to a "restricted classification". He closed by suggesting that until that security classification was changed, "due to death or eflux [sic] of time, "any film made will have to be an historical romance rather than history".

In 1975 British researcher Ian Sayer began a nine-year investigation into the Guinness entry. The results of his investigation, which confirmed a cover up by the U.S. government together with the involvement of U.S. military and former Wehrmacht and SS officers in the theft, were published in the 1984 book Nazi Gold — The Sensational Story of the World's Greatest Robbery — and the Greatest Criminal Cover-Up. The investigation finally led to two of the missing gold bars (valued in 2019 at over $1 million) being handed over by German officials to the U.S. government in a secret ceremony at Bonn on 27 September 1996. The bullion was transported to the Bank of England where it was held to the account of the Tripartite Commission for the Restitution of Monetary Gold (TCRMG). The first disclosure that the Bank was holding the two bars (complete with Nazi markings) came from a press release issued by the bank on 8 May 1997 which confirmed that the two bars were those that had been identified as missing in the book Nazi Gold. Sayer had given information to the United States Department of State concerning the two bars (amongst other things) in July 1978. In 1983 they finally agreed to investigate using Sayer's evidence. The State Department investigation did not conclude until 1997. On 11 December 1997 Sayer was invited, by the Secretary General of the TCRMG, to view the two bars in the gold bullion vaults of the Bank of England. In addition to being accorded this rare honour, he was also photographed holding the bars, which he had been instrumental in tracking down.

Filming
The project was announced by Metro-Goldwyn-Mayer in November 1968 under the title of The Warriors. Filming commenced in July 1969 and was completed in December. The film was made and released during a time of great financial difficulties for MGM, in the early days of the turbulent ownership by Kirk Kerkorian. It was shot on location in the Istrian village of Vižinada in Croatia, in the ruins of the Beočin palace in Serbia, in the Yugoslavia, and finally in London. One of the reasons for the selection of Yugoslavia as the main location was that, in 1969, it was one of the few nations whose army were still equipped with operating World War II mechanized equipment, both German and American, including in particular the M4 Sherman tank. This simplified the film's logistics tremendously.

During pre-production, George Kennedy turned down the role of Big Joe, despite an offered fee of $300,000, because he did not like the role. The original script included a female role which was removed just before filming began. Ingrid Pitt had been cast in the role (she had worked on Where Eagles Dare with Eastwood and Hutton the previous year). She later said she was "virtually climbing on board the plane bound for Yugoslavia when word came through that my part had been cut". In the film's climax, there is a nod to the ending of The Good, the Bad and the Ugly, another Eastwood film, including a similar musical score, and the overdubbing on the soundtrack of non-existent jangling spurs.

Vehicles and weapons
The Tiger I tanks were actually Soviet T-34 tanks that had been modified to look like the German tank. The U.S. Sherman tanks were the M4A3E4 variant. Kelly's platoon also drove an M3 Gun Motor Carriage before it was destroyed on the hill, as well as several half-tracks. The Germans also drove a Kübelwagen.

Kelly's men were armed with a mix of .30 caliber machine guns, Browning Automatic Rifles, and Thompson submachine guns, with few carbines and no M-1 rifles. Gutkowski, the unit's sniper, was armed with a Soviet Mosin–Nagant M91/30 rifle. The German soldiers were armed almost exclusively with MP 40 submachine guns.

The U.S. plane that attacked Kelly's group was a Yugoslavian Soko 522 painted with U.S. Army air force roundels.

Deleted scenes
MGM cut approximately 20 minutes from the film before its theatrical release. Eastwood said later in interviews that he was very disappointed about the re-cut by MGM because he felt that many of the deleted scenes not only gave depth to the characters, but also made the movie much better. Some of the deleted scenes were shown on promotional stills and described in interviews with cast and crew for Cinema Retro's special edition article about Kelly's Heroes:
 Oddball and his crew pack up to go across the lines to meet up with Kelly and others while local village girls are running around half naked.
 The platoon encounters a group of German soldiers and naked girls swimming in a pool.
 While they wait for Oddball in the barn at night, Kelly and Big Joe talk about their disillusionment with the war and why Kelly was made a scapegoat for the attack that resulted in his demotion. Another scene was deleted from this part, in which the platoon decides they do not want to continue with the mission, and Gutkowski threatens Kelly at gunpoint, but Big Joe and Crapgame side with Kelly.
 General Colt is in bed with some women when he gets a call that Kelly and others have broken through the enemy lines.
 During the attack on the town, production designer John Barry had a cameo as a British airman hiding from the Germans.
 One promotional still shows Kelly finding a wounded German soldier among the ruined houses during the final town attack.
 Kelly, Oddball and Big Joe discuss tactics while standing on an abandoned Tiger tank before the scene in which they negotiate with the German tank commander.
 When Kelly and platoon drive off at the end, a bunch of soldiers yell at them that they are headed in the wrong direction.

Musical score and soundtrack

The film score was composed, arranged, and conducted by Lalo Schifrin, while the soundtrack album was released by MGM Records in 1970. The President of MGM Records, Mike Curb, wrote two songs for the film, with his group the Mike Curb Congregation performing on a number of the songs.

The soundtrack was released on LP, as well a subsequent CD featuring the LP tracks, by Chapter III Records; both were mostly re-recordings. An expanded edition of the soundtrack was released by Film Score Monthly in 2005.
The main musical theme of the film (at both beginning and end) is "Burning Bridges", sung by the Mike Curb Congregation with music by Schifrin. There is also a casual rendition of the music heard in the background near the middle of the film. The Mike Curb Congregation's recording of "Burning Bridges" reached #34 on the Billboard Hot 100 singles chart on March 6, 1971; but did much better in South Africa, where it was the #1 song on the charts for five weeks ending in November 1970, and in New Zealand, where it spent two weeks at #1 in March 1971. It also had a two-week stay at #1 in Australia, and in Canada the song reached #23 in March 1971.

Mike Curb wrote the song "All for the Love of Sunshine" for the film, with the Mike Curb Congregation providing background on the recording by Hank Williams, Jr. The song became the first #1 country hit for Williams.

Reception
The film received mostly positive reviews. It was voted at number 34 in Channel 4's 100 Greatest War Films of All Time. The film earned $5.2 million in US theatrical rentals.

Film review aggregator website Rotten Tomatoes gave the film an approval rating of 78% based on 23 reviews, with an average rating of 6.83/10. The website's critical consensus reads: "Kelly's Heroes subverts its World War II setting with pointed satirical commentary on modern military efforts, offering an entertaining hybrid of heist caper and battlefield action".

Roger Greenspun of The New York Times described the action scenes as "good clean scary fun," until it goes "terribly wrong" when many soldiers are killed and "the balance alters to the horrors of war. To acknowledge its deaths the film has no resources above the conventional antagonistic ironies and comradely pieties of most war movies. And since its subject is not war, but burglary masquerading as war, the easy acceptance of the masquerade—which is apparently quite beyond the film's control—becomes a denial of moral perception that depresses the mind and bewilders the imagination". Arthur D. Murphy of Variety called the film "a very preposterous, very commercial World War II comedy meller, the type which combines roadshow production values and length with B-plot artistry". Gene Siskel of the Chicago Tribune gave the film two-and-a-half stars out of four and wrote that "the bombing becomes tedious. One quickly realizes anytime a large object is brought into focus it will soon be incinerated. With only one dramatic problem—getting the gold—it is hard to imagine how the producers and directors could let the film run nearly two-and-one-half hours". Charles Champlin of the Los Angeles Times called the film "a picture which confuses shrillness with wit and slaughter with slapstick", adding, "Even the estimable Donald Sutherland can't redeem the picture. Despite his artful efforts, his role as a long-haired hippie tank commander is so ludicrously out of time and place that it becomes hard to stomach in a film in which, elsewhere, two GIs trapped in a mine field are gunned down like cans on a stump. You can't poison your cake and eat it too". Alan M. Kriegsman of The Washington Post described the film as "a case of machismo gone mad," and wondered "how a photographer like Gabriel Figueroa, who shot a number of Luis Bunuel's finest films, among other things, ever got roped into such a jejune, tasteless project". The Monthly Film Bulletin stated that "In terms of rip-roaring, bulldozing action, this attempt to cross The Dirty Dozen with Where Eagles Dare can be said to have achieved its object". However, the review went on, "With all energy apparently expended on sustaining over two hours of consistently devastating explosions, pyrotechnics and demolition, little attention has been paid either to period detail (resulting in mini-skirted townswomen and the description of conditions in terms of 'hung-up' and 'freaked out') or to the script, which is jolly, vituperative, and little else".

Home media
Kelly's Heroes was released on DVD by Warner Home Video on August 1, 2000, in a Region 1 widescreen DVD (one of several solo DVDs marketed as the Clint Eastwood Collection). The film was re-released again on June 1, 2010, this time as a Blu-ray Region A widescreen two-disc set also with Eastwood's 1968 World War II feature film, Where Eagles Dare.

See also
 List of American films of 1970
 Les Morfalous, a French 1984 remake of Kelly's Heroes

Citations

General and cited references

External links

 
 
 
 
 
 Kelly's Heroes online

1970 films
1970 war films
1970s English-language films
1970s heist films
1970s war comedy films
American World War II films
American heist films
American satirical films
English-language Yugoslav films
Films about armoured warfare
Films about deserters
Films about the United States Army
Films directed by Brian G. Hutton
Films scored by Lalo Schifrin
Films set in 1944
Films set in France
Films shot in Yugoslavia
Films with screenplays by Troy Kennedy Martin
Metro-Goldwyn-Mayer films
Military humor in film
Western Front of World War II films
World War II films based on actual events
Yugoslav World War II films
Yugoslav war films
1970s American films